Almaroof Khandowya Family (Urdu:المعروف کھنڈوعہ فیملی , also spelled Khandowya, Khandowa) The Nation of Chauhan Lajput known as Khandowa is a tribe living predominantly in northern, central, and western parts of Pakistani Punjab, with significant numbers also residing in  Jhelum Chakwal and to a lesser extent in  Khandowa.
Khandowya is a tribe (agricultural) found in Jhelum. They appear to be a branch of the Chauhjln Lajput.''

History 
The original genealogy is called Chauhan Lajput Almaroof Khsndowya And tell me one thing about them, Khandowa calls himself Awan's brother. And let him also abrogate the seven Arab genealogies on his own.

On a rural level, Khandowa historically were of the zamindar or landowning class and many Khandowa families to this day live on and cultivate land, which their ancestors have held for centuries. They often carry titles typical to Punjabis who own tracts of ancestral land.

Notable people 
 Naseer Ahmed Khandowa former Chairman UC of the Almaroof Khandowya tribe Golepur and Tehsil Pind Dadan Khan

See also 
Kallar Kahar Tehsil
Khandowa Chakwal
Khandowa Pind Dadan Khan – newpakhistorian

References 

Khandowa Family
Punjabi tribes
Social groups of Pakistan
Pakistani names
Punjabi-language surnames